Magok Station is a subway station of Seoul Subway Line 5. It was opened in 2008, much later than the rest of Line 5, because the area underwent a significant redevelopment transforming a previously largely residential area into a completely new core city with the headquarters and R&D centers of major multinationals such as LG and Lotte, Seoul's first botanic garden, a major Ewha Womans University hospital and large apartment complexes.

Initially opened with only one exit, the station now features seven exits and is right next to a major BRT bus stop.

Station layout

References

Railway stations opened in 2008
Seoul Metropolitan Subway stations
Metro stations in Gangseo District, Seoul